Yuka Tsujiyoko (辻横 由佳 Tsujiyoko Yuka) is a Japanese video game music composer. She is best known for her contributions to the Fire Emblem and Paper Mario series, and several other Intelligent Systems developed games. She also scored the Super Scope games Battle Clash, and its sequel Metal Combat: Falcon's Revenge.

She was born Yuka Bamba in Uji, Kyoto Prefecture, Japan. Tsujiyoko studied piano when she was in a preschool. She composed her first original composition when she was in high school as an assignment for her music class. Tsujiyoko attended Osaka Electric Communications Junior College, and she majored in electronic engineering. Before she joined Intelligent Systems, Tsujiyoko worked as a computer programmer for a software company. Tsujiyoko was inspired by Pat Metheny and Hirokazu Tanaka, with the latter being her mentor as he scored her first game project, Fire Emblem: Shadow Dragon and the Blade of Light.

Works

References

External links
 

Year of birth missing (living people)
Freelance musicians
Japanese composers
Japanese women composers
Living people
Nintendo people
Video game composers